The Speedway Great Britain Championship 2017 was the second division of British speedway. It was the first time that it was known as the SGB Championship after changing its name from the Premier League.

The season ran between March and October 2017 and 10 teams participated.

The Sheffield Tigers were the champions defeating the Ipswich Witches in the Grand Final.

Broadcasting rights
British TV broadcasting rights changed hands before the start of the 2017 SGB Championship season, when Sky withdrew from their negotiated contract with the BSPA. BT then obtained the broadcasting rights for the 2017 season to be shown on their BT Sport channels.

Final League table

2017 SGB Championship play-offs

Play-off Final
First leg

Second leg

Sheffield were declared League Champions, winning on aggregate 99–81.

Promotion and relegation play-off

Knockout Cup
The 2017 SGB Championship Knockout Cup was the 50th edition of the Knockout Cup for tier two teams. It was the first time it would be known as the SGB Championship Knockout Cup. Peterborough Panthers were the winners of the competition.

First round

From Quarter Final stage

Final
First leg

Second leg

Peterborough were declared Knockout Cup Champions, winning on aggregate 92–88.

Final leading averages

Teams and final averages 
Berwick Bandits

 9.07
 6.98
 6.81
 6.50
 6.26
 5.91
 5.89
 4.73
 4.34
 2.78
 2.47

Edinburgh Monarchs

 9.24
 8.93
 8.32
 6.39
 5.42
 5.14
 5.03
 3.82

Glasgow Tigers

 9.03
 8.93
 8.40
 7.17
 6.62
 4.50
 3.16

Ipswich Witches

 9.29
 8.99
 8.38
 7.81
  7.35
 6.83
 5.30
 5.03
 4.36
 4.80

Newcastle Diamonds

 9.74
 9.44
 8.00
 7.87
 7.53
 5.76
 4.75
 2.92
 2.79
 2.33 (3 matches only)
 0.80

Peterborough Panthers

 9.22
 8.99
 7.83
 7.06
 6.49
 6.44 
 5.57
 3.50
 2.97
 2.57

Redcar Bears

 8.78
 8.06
 7.62
 7.23
 6.13
 5.95
 5.64
 4.96
 3.32

Scunthorpe Scorpions

 8.36
 7.48
 7.44
 7.23
 6.91
 6.18
 5.83
 5.51
 3.39
 3.76

Sheffield Tigers

 9.77
 9.00
 8.75
 7.53
 6.11
 6.04
 4.70
 3.13
 2.85
 0.36

Workington Comets

 10.30
 7.47
 7.39
 6.61
 5.63
 5.20
 3.90
 2.40

See also
SGB Premiership 2017
List of United Kingdom Speedway League Champions
Knockout Cup (speedway)

References

Championship
Championship
2017